Epitaph is a live video released by Judas Priest on DVD and Blu-Ray on 28 May 2013. It was filmed at the Hammersmith Apollo on 26 May 2012, which was the last date of the Epitaph World Tour, where they performed songs from each Halford-era album from Rocka Rolla to Nostradamus. The show was first seen in cinemas in New York City on 14 May and in London on 15 May with special screenings around the world on 16 May. It then premiered on VH1 Classic in the United States on 25 May.

Track listing

Reception
The DVD received critical acclaim. Ultimate Guitar gave a positive review saying, "It shows the entire band continuing to defy the laws of nature and rationality, as they dominate the stage with ever increasing power and passion that any fan will sit back in amazement at." Rustyn Rose of Metalholic said, "Epitaph is a must own DVD for any metal fan, and especially for the Judas Priest faithful." Johnny Churchill of Metaltalk.net talked about the cinema version, "Watching the DVD in a cinema is great fun and if you get the chance at home, then draw the curtains, crank up your TV to 11, sit back for two hours with a beer and just enjoy."

Charts

Personnel
Rob Halford – Vocals
Glenn Tipton – Guitar, Vocals
Richie Faulkner – Guitar, Vocals
Ian Hill – Bass
Scott Travis – Drums

Production
Tom Allom - Producer, Mixing, Mastering
Richard Kayvan - Producer, Mixing, Mastering
Mark Wilkinson - Artwork
Joe Lester - Photography
Alex Walker - Producer, Directing, Editing
Eric Lehner - Director of Photography
Jayne Andrews - Executive Producer

References

Judas Priest video albums
Albums produced by Tom Allom
2013 live albums